The 1815 Rhode Island gubernatorial election was held on April 19, 1815.

Incumbent Federalist Governor William Jones won re-election to a fifth term, defeating Democratic-Republican nominee Peleg Arnold.

General election

Candidates
Peleg Arnold, Democratic-Republican, former Chief Justice of the Rhode Island Supreme Court
William Jones, Federalist, incumbent Governor

Results

County results

References

1815
Rhode Island
Gubernatorial